Capler Camp is an Iron Age hill fort located 2.5 km south of Fownhope, Herefordshire.

The Camp is on a hill top above the River Wye. It has a double layer of ditches enclosing ten acres.

The Wye Valley Walk goes through this land.

References

Further reading
Children, G; Nash, G (1994) Prehistoric Sites of Herefordshire Logaston Press

External links
Capler Camp at PastScape
Capler Camp Monument Detail

Hill forts in Herefordshire